Gopal Saini (born 1954) is a former Indian middle distance runner. He held the national record in 3000 meters Steeplechase which was unbeaten for 37 years. Saini set the 3000m Steeplechase record (8:30.88) in Tokyo,Japan on 5 June 1981 which was then broken by Avinash Sable by clocking 8:29.80 at the 2018 National Open Championships in Bhubaneswar. Sable set a new national record of 8:11.20 in August 2022 at the 2022 Commonwealth Games in Birmingham.Saini represented in 1980 22nd olympic games in Soviet Union for men's 5000m race.

He hails from Rajasthan. He was conferred Arjuna award in 1981 for his achievements.
He practiced on terrains for strength of legs. He currently works in SBBJ and also owns a restaurant in Jaipur.

References 
Indian Records

1954 births
Living people
Indian male middle-distance runners
Indian male steeplechase runners
Athletes from Rajasthan
Rajasthani people
Olympic athletes of India
Athletes (track and field) at the 1980 Summer Olympics
Asian Games medalists in athletics (track and field)
Athletes (track and field) at the 1978 Asian Games
Athletes (track and field) at the 1982 Asian Games
Recipients of the Arjuna Award
Asian Games silver medalists for India
Medalists at the 1978 Asian Games
Medalists at the 1982 Asian Games